Seppo Hänninen (born 11 July 1943) is a Finnish speed skater. He competed at the 1964 Winter Olympics, the 1968 Winter Olympics and the 1972 Winter Olympics.

References

External links
 

1943 births
Living people
Finnish male speed skaters
Olympic speed skaters of Finland
Speed skaters at the 1964 Winter Olympics
Speed skaters at the 1968 Winter Olympics
Speed skaters at the 1972 Winter Olympics
People from Parikkala
Sportspeople from South Karelia